is a Japanese pianist and composer.

He writes primarily for the piano, though orchestral arrangements for some of his pieces exist. Born in Urawa-ku, Saitama, Kuramoto studied the piano from an early age. At school, he studied Rachmaninoff and performed as a part-time soloist in orchestras. He later went on to study at the Tokyo Institute of Technology and obtained a master's degree in Applied Physics. Kuramoto chose to become a musician.

Kuramoto concentrated on the performance of the piano, the composition and arrangement of classical music and popular music. As a professional musician, his interests span genres from classical to folk songs and popular music. Kuramoto never attended a music conservatory and attained his knowledge mostly through self-study. At the age of 35, Kuramoto had the first of his CD published. To this day, he has published 18 CDs.

Musical style
Kuramoto's style of music shows influence from a variety of composers from different periods. Most notably, by Rachmaninoff, Chopin and Ravel.

External links
 Yuhki Kuramoto last.fm
 

1951 births
20th-century Japanese male musicians
20th-century Japanese pianists
21st-century Japanese male musicians
21st-century Japanese pianists
Japanese composers
Japanese male composers
Japanese male pianists
Japanese pianists
Living people
New-age pianists
Tokyo Institute of Technology alumni